Fuzzy Warbles Volume 4 is the fourth volume in the Fuzzy Warbles series, released in February 2003. The Fuzzy Warbles Series brings together demos, rarities and side projects from XTC founding member Andy Partridge.

Track listing
All songs written by Andy Partridge.

 "Tunes" – 0:24
 "Bumpercars" – 3:59
 "The Art Song (Something Good with Your Life)" – 2:51
 "I'm Playing My Fano" – 1:11
 "Zonked Right out on Life" – 5:17
 "All I Dream of Is a Friend" – 3:43
 "Peck the Ground Like a Chicken" – 1:26
 "That's Really Super Supergirl" – 3:40
 "Brainiac's Daughter" – 1:48
 "Blue Beret" – 3:07
 "Gangway, Electric Guitar Is Coming Through" – 1:50
 "Mechanical Planet" – 3:54
 "Helicopter" – 3:51
 "The Ugly Underneath" – 3:13
 "OMGO" – 2:03
 "Where Is Your Heart?" – 2:57
 "Hey, It's Alan Burston!" – 0:22
 "Season Cycle" – 4:51
 "Countdown to Christmas Partytime" – 5:36

Personnel
Andy Partridge – instruments and vocals on all tracks
Dave Gregory – Synth guitar on 12, recording engineer on 12, guitar and backing vocal on 13
Colin Moulding – bass and backing vocal on 13
Terry Chambers – drums on 13
Dave Morgan - psychedelic pensioner on 18
 Steve Warren and Bubble - Recording engineers on 13

Credits
All songs were recorded at Andy's home except 12 at Dave Gregory's home and 13 at Redbrick Studio, Swindon Town Hall.
Mastered by Ian Cooper at Metropolis Mastering, London
Sleeve art by Andrew Swainson
Thank you thank you Debbie Swainson for typing out all my gibber and for the translation on the cover of Warbles 3. Swindon for having something to kick against and Erica for being smart.
Big thanks to Virgin Records for making this series possible, and to Dave Gregory for the use of track 12.

Andy Partridge albums
Demo albums
2003 compilation albums